House of Councillors elections were held in Japan on 20 April 1947. The Japan Socialist Party won more seats than any other party, although independents emerged as the largest group in the House. Most independents joined the Ryokufūkai parliamentary group in the first Diet session making it the largest group, and Ryokufūkai member Tsuneo Matsudaira was elected the first president of the House of Councillors.

Results

By constituency

References

House of Councillors (Japan) elections
Japan
1947 elections in Japan
April 1947 events in Asia
Election and referendum articles with incomplete results